Khaku (also Romanized as Khākū) is a village in Abaru Rural District, in the Central District of Hamadan County, Hamadan Province, Iran. At the 2006 census, its population was 448, in 112 families.

References 

Populated places in Hamadan County